Vestlandsbanken was a bank based in Bergen, Norway. It was established in 1926 and explicitly did all its business in Nynorsk. In 1975, it merged with the Oslo-based Oslo Nye Sparebank, also it a Nynorsk-bank. In 1987, Vestlandsbanken merged with Bøndernes Bank, Forretningsbanken and Buskerudbanken to create Fokus Bank.

References

Defunct banks of Norway
Nynorsk
Companies based in Bergen
Banks established in 1926
Banks disestablished in 1987
Norwegian companies established in 1926
1987 disestablishments in Norway